AISECT University, Jharkhand is a private university located in Hazaribagh, Jharkhand, India. The university was established in 2016 by the AISECT Foundation through the AISECT University Act, 2016. It offers various diploma, undergraduate and postgraduate courses.

Faculties
The institute offers various diploma undergraduate and postgraduate courses through the following eight faculties:
 Agriculture
 Arts
 Commerce
 Computer Science & Information Technology
 Journalism & Mass Communication
 Management
 Science
 Yoga & Naturopathy

See also
Education in India
List of private universities in India
List of institutions of higher education in Jharkhand

References

External links

Hazaribagh
Universities in Jharkhand
Educational institutions established in 2016
2016 establishments in Jharkhand
Private universities in India